Jean-Pierre Lacroix is a French diplomat who currently serves as the United Nations Under-Secretary-General for Peace Operations.

Prior to this appointment of 14 February 2017 by United Nations Secretary-General António Guterres he served as the Director for the United Nations and International Organizations for France's Ministry of Foreign Affairs. Lacroix replaced Hervé Ladsous of France, extending a 20-year lock on the job.

Education
Lacroix is a graduate of the Institute of Economic and Commercial Sciences, Sciences Po in Paris and the National School of Administration (ENA) and holds Bachelor of Arts degrees.

Career
In 2011, Lacroix held the position of France's Ambassador to Sweden. From 2006 to 2009, he was the Deputy Permanent Representative of France to the United Nations in New York. From 2002 to 2006, he was the deputy director of the United Nations and International Organizations Division of the France's Ministry of Foreign Affairs. He has also held positions at the Embassy of France in Prague, the Embassy of France in Washington and in the Cabinet of Prime Minister Édouard Balladur (1993-1995).

Other activities
 International Gender Champions (IGC), Member

References

French officials of the United Nations
Living people
Place of birth missing (living people)
French diplomats
1950 births